Dhivya Matriculation Higher Secondary School, commonly called Dhivya School or Dhivya Matric Hr Sec School was established in 1992 in Chetpet, Thiruvannamalai District, Tamil Nadu, India (12°27′05″N 79°21′08″E).

Recognition 
Dhivya Matriculation Higher Secondary School is recognized by Government of Tamil Nadu and affiliated to Directorate of Matriculation Schools, Chennai.

Group of institutions 

The management has an excellent track record for more than 20 years for serving education in very high standards.
 Dhivya Polytechnic College (திவ்யா பாலிடெக்னிக் கல்லூரி)
 Dhivya Matriculation Higher Secondary School
 Dhivya Arts and Science College
 Dhivya High School
 Dhivya College of Education
 Dhivya Teacher Training Institute

External links

High schools and secondary schools in Tamil Nadu
Education in Tiruvannamalai district
Educational institutions established in 1992
1992 establishments in Tamil Nadu